The West Indies cricket team began touring South Africa on 14 December 2007. The two teams played three Test matches, five One Day Internationals and two Twenty20 Internationals before the end of the tour on 3 February 2008.

Prior to the series, West Indies had never registered a Test victory in South Africa and lost the previous series 2–0, in 2003/4 and lost the last two meetings between the two sides, in the ICC World Twenty20, where South Africa won by 3 wickets, and in the World Cup in the West Indies, where the South Africans emerged victorious by 67 runs.

The West Indies warmed up for the series with a 3–1 one-day international series victory over Zimbabwe in Zimbabwe although their preparations were hampered by a hamstring injury to acting captain Chris Gayle. South Africa beat New Zealand in Test and One Day International series while also winning the one-off Twenty20 International.

West Indian captain Ramnaresh Sarwan missed the tour through injury, meaning Gayle was captain in his absence, however thumb and hamstring injuries to Gayle left Dwayne Bravo as captain for both Twenty20 Internationals and the entire ODI series. South Africa named the same Test squad that beat both New Zealand, and Pakistan, although Neil McKenzie was added to the squad ahead of the second Test and Monde Zondeki was added ahead of the third Test.

Twenty20 series

1st Twenty20

2nd Twenty20

Test series

1st Test

2nd Test

3rd Test

ODI series

1st ODI

2nd ODI

3rd ODI

4th ODI

5th ODI

Tour matches

Makhaya Ntini Invitation XI v West Indians

South Africa A v West Indians

2007 in South African cricket
2007 in West Indian cricket
2008 in South African cricket
2008 in West Indian cricket
International cricket competitions in 2007–08
2007–08 South African cricket season
2007-08